Agnes Jebet Tirop (23 October 1995 – 13 October 2021) was a Kenyan professional long-distance runner. She won bronze medals in the 10,000 metres at the 2017 and 2019 World Athletics Championships. At the 2015 IAAF World Cross Country Championships, Tirop became the second-youngest ever gold medallist in the women's race after Zola Budd. At the time of her death in 2021, she was the world-record holder in the 10 kilometres women's only event.

She was a medallist at junior level at the 2012 and 2014 World Junior Championships in Athletics as well as the 2013 IAAF World Cross Country Championships. She was also the junior champion at the 2014 African Cross Country Championships.

Career
Agnes Tirop first came to prominence at the national level in 2012, when she was runner-up to world junior champion Faith Chepngetich Kipyegon at the Kenyan Cross Country Championships. This led to her first national selection and international medal at the 2012 African Cross Country Championships; where she was again the runner-up to Kipyegon and took the junior silver medal. She was Kenya's most prominent entrant for the 5000 metres at the 2012 World Junior Championships in Athletics and finished with a bronze medal in a personal best of 15:36.74 minutes behind Ethiopian opposition.

Tirop was again second to Kipyegon at the 2013 Kenyan Cross Country Championships and teamwork between the pair led to a Kenyan 1–2 and team title at the 2013 IAAF World Cross Country Championships – Kipyegon defended her title while Tirop was a narrow second to claim her first medal at the competition. She made progress on the track that year, setting personal bests of 8:39.13 minutes for the 3000 metres and 14:50.36 minutes for the 5000 metres, and also on the roads with a half marathon best of 71:57 minutes.

In the 2014 season she finally emerged from Kipyegon's shadow. Tirop won the Kenyan cross country junior title and then dominated the junior race at the 2014 African Cross Country Championships, leading the Kenyans to victory by a 14-second margin (Kipyegon won both senior races). She was unable to achieve such a margin over African runner-up Alemitu Heroye at the 2014 World Junior Championships in Athletics and was again third in the 5000 m, while the Ethiopians extended Kenya's historic lack of a gold medal in that event.

Tirop entered the senior ranks in the 2015 season and immediately performed well, winning the Eldoret Discovery Cross Country in Kenya. She was second to Kipyegon at the Kenyan senior national championship race and earned a senior national selection – a performance which filled her with confidence.  She said at the time "I did not even believe I could make the team. I will not fear running against seniors." For the 2015 IAAF World Cross Country Championships, after Kipyegon withdrew the reigning world champion Emily Chebet was seen as Kenya's leading athlete, and Tirop as a key team member. Despite this being her senior international debut and the fourth youngest athlete in the field, Tirop took to the front and gradually moved away from the field to win the senior gold medal some five seconds ahead of Ethiopia's Senbere Teferi. This made the 19-year-old the second-youngest winner of that title in championships history, after Zola Budd's win in 1985, and also brought her Kenya's 300th medal at the competition. With Ethiopia rounding out the top four and defending champion Chebet in sixth, Kenya came in second in the team race.

In 2017 she participated in the World Championships held in London, winning the bronze medal in the 10,000 metres event, with a time of 31:03.50, her personal best in the distance. In 2018, she won the World 10K Bangalore race in a course record time. She won a bronze medal in the same event at the 2019 World Athletics Championships.

At the delayed 2020 Summer Olympics, Tirop came fourth in the 5000 metres event. In September 2021, Tirop broke the world record in a 10 kilometres women-only event. She set a time of 30:01 in an event in Herzogenaurach, Germany. In October 2021, she came second in the Giants Geneva race behind Kalkidan Gezahegne in a time of 30:20.

Death 
Tirop was found dead in her home in Iten, Elgeyo-Marakwet County, on 13 October 2021; she had multiple stab wounds in her neck and abdomen. Authorities believe a domestic altercation occurred and Tirop was stabbed, as they also found her car windows had been shattered. A search began for Tirop's husband, Emmanuel Rotich, when he went missing after calling his family crying and asking for God's forgiveness for something he had done. He then was involved in a lengthy high-speed chase, trying to flee the country, when he ultimately rammed his getaway vehicle into a lorry near Mombasa. He was subsequently arrested and questioned about Tirop's death.

Tirop's funeral was attended by around 1,000 people, and she was buried in her home town.

Personal bests 
These were Tirop's lifetime bests.

 2000 metres – 5:48.65 (Amsterdam 2013)
 3000 metres – 8:22.92 (Doha 2020)
 5000 metres – 14:20.68 (London 2019)
 10,000 metres – 30:25.20 (Doha 2019)
Road
 5 km – 15:30 (Bolzano 2017)
 10 km – 30:01 (Herzogenaurach 2021)  World record

International competitions

References

External links

1995 births
2021 deaths
Kenyan female long-distance runners
World Athletics Cross Country Championships winners
World Athletics Championships athletes for Kenya
World Athletics Championships medalists
Kenyan female cross country runners
People from Uasin Gishu County
Athletes (track and field) at the 2020 Summer Olympics
Olympic athletes of Kenya
Deaths by stabbing in Kenya
Kenyan murder victims
2021 murders in Kenya
Female murder victims
People murdered in Kenya
Violence against women in Kenya